The Edward Stanford Travel Writing Awards celebrate the best travel writing and travel writers in the world. The awards include the Stanford Dolman Travel Book of the Year and the Edward Stanford Award for Outstanding Contribution to Travel Writing.

The Stanford Dolman Travel Book of the Year was previously called Dolman Best Travel Book Award (2006-2014). The award is named after Edward Stanford and is sponsored by Stanfords, a travel books and map store established in London in 1853. The Stanford Dolman Travel Book of the Year is one of the two principal annual travel book awards in Britain, and the only one that is open to all writers. The other award is that made each year by the British Guild of Travel Writers, but that is limited to authors who are members of the Guild.

The first Dolman award was given in 2006, just two years after the only other travel book award - the Thomas Cook Travel Book Award which ran for 25 years - was abandoned by its sponsor. From its founding through 2014, the £1,000 to £2,500 prize was organized by the Authors' Club and was sponsored by and named after club member William Dolman. Beginning in 2015, a new sponsor Stanfords, a travel book store, was established along with an increase to £5,000 for the winner.

List of awards
The Edward Stanford Travel Writing Awards consist of the following:

 Stanford Dolman Travel Book of the Year, in association with The Authors' Club
 Outstanding Contribution to Travel Writing 
 Fiction with a Sense of Place
 Adventure Travel Book of the Year 
 Travel Memoir of the Year
 Children's Travel Book of the Year 
 Travel Blog of the Year 
 Photography and Illustrated Travel Book of The Year
 Food & Travel Book of the Year 
 Innovation in Travel Publishing 
 New Travel Writer of the Year

Stanford Dolman Travel Book of the Year
 = winner

Stanford Dolman Travel Book of the Year

2021

 Paolo Cognetti, Without Ever Reaching the Summit: A Himalayan Journey
 Erika Fatland, The Border: A Journey Around Russia Through North Korea, China, Mongolia, Kazakhstan, Azerbaijan, Georgia, Ukraine, Belarus, Lithuania, Poland, Latvia, Estonia, Finland, Norway, and the Northeast Passage
 Taran Khan, Shadow City: A Woman Walks Kabul
 Nanjala Nyabola, Traveling While Black: Essays Inspired by a Life on the Move
 Jini Reddy, Wanderland: A Search for Magic in the Landscape
 Sophy Roberts, The Lost Pianos of Siberia
 C J Schuler, Along the Amber Route: St Petersburg to Venice
 Jonathan C Slaght, Owls of the Eastern Ice: The Quest to Find and Save the World's Largest Owl

2020
  Robert Macfarlane, Underland
 Rory Mclean, Pravda Ha Ha
 Paul Theroux, On the Plain of Snakes
 Nicholas Jubber, Epic Continent
 Simon Winder, Lotharingia
 Anna Sherman, The Bells Of Old Tokyo
 Richard Bassett, Last Days in Old Europe
 Monisha Rajesh, Around the World in 80 Trains
 Sara Wheeler, Mud and Stars

2019

  William Atkins, The Immeasurable World: Journeys in Desert Places 
 Ben Coates, The Rhine: Following Europe's Greatest River from Amsterdam to the Alps 
 Damian Le Bas, The Stopping Places: A Journey Through Gypsy Britain 
 Alev Scott, Map and Illustration by Jamie Whyte, Ottoman Odyssey: Travels Through a Lost Empire 
 Witold Szablowski, Dancing Bears: True Stories about Longing for the Old Days (translated from Polish by Antonia Lloyd Jones) 
 Daniel Trilling, Lights in the Distance: Exile and Refuge at the Borders of Europe

2018 

 Patrick Barkham, Islander: A Journey Around Our Archipelago
 Garrett Carr, The Rule of the Land: Walking Ireland's Border 
  Kapka Kassabova, Border: A Journey to the Edge of Europe
 Kushanava Choudhury, The Epic City: The World on the Streets of Calcutta
 Philip Hoare, Risingtidefallingstar
 Nick Hunt, Where the Wild Winds Are: Walking Europe's Winds from the Pennines to Provence
 Isambard Wilkinson, Photographs by Chev Wilkinson, Travels in a Dervish Cloak

2017 no award

2016

 James Attlee, Station To Station: Searching for Stories On The Great Western Line
 Geoff Dyer, White Sands: Experiences from the Outside World
 Elisabeth Luard, Squirrel Pie (and other stories): Adventures in Food Across the Globe
 Jim Perrin, The Hills of Wales
  Julian Sayarer, Interstate: Hitchhiking Through the State of a Nation
 Paul Theroux, Deep South

2015

 Philip Marsden, Rising Ground: A Search for the Spirit of Place
 Helena Attlee, The Land Where Lemons Grow: The Story of Italy and Its Citrus Fruit
  Horatio Clare, Down to the Sea in Ships: Of Ageless Oceans and Modern Men
 Nick Hunt, Walking the Woods and the Water: In Patrick Leigh Fermor's footsteps from the Hook of Holland to the Golden Horn
 Jens Mühling, A Journey into Russia
 Elizabeth Pisani, Indonesia Etc: Exploring the Improbable Nation

Dolman Best Travel Book Award

2014

 Oliver Bullough, The Last Man in Russia
 Patrick Leigh Fermor, The Broken Road
 Charlotte Higgins, Under Another Sky: Journeys in Roman Britain
 Iain Sinclair, American Smoke
  Sylvain Tesson, Consolations of the Forest: Alone in a Cabin in the Middle Taiga
 Sara Wheeler, O My America!

2013

 Noo Saro-Wiwa, Looking For Transwonderland: Travels in Nigeria
 Jeremy Seal, Meander: East to West Along a Turkish River
 Kathleen Jamie, Sightlines
 A. A. Gill, The Golden Door: Letters to America
  Robert MacFarlane, The Old Ways: A Journey on Foot
 Michael Jacobs, The Robber of Memories: A River Journey Through Colombia

2012

 Julia Blackburn, Thin Paths: Journeys in and around an Italian Mountain Village
  John Gimlette, Wild Coast: Travels on South America's Untamed Edge
 Jacek Hugo-Bader, White Fever: A Journey to the Frozen Heart of Siberia
 Olivia Laing, To the River: A Journey Beneath the Surface
 Sharifa Rhodes-Pitts, Harlem is Nowhere: A Journey to the Mecca of Black America
 Colin Thubron, To a Mountain in Tibet

2011

 Nicolas Jubber, Drinking Arak off an Ayatollah's Beard: A Journey Through the Inside-Out Worlds of Iran and Afghanistan
  Rachel Polonsky, Molotov's Magic Lantern: A Journey in Russian History
 Katherine Russell Rich, Dreaming in Hindi: Coming Awake in Another Language
 Graham Robb, Parisians: An Adventure History of Paris
 Douglas Rogers, The Last Resort: A Memoir of Zimbabwe
 Simon Winder, Germania: In Wayward Pursuit of the Germans and Their History

2010

 William Blacker, Along the Enchanted Way
 Horatio Clare, A Single Swallow
 Matthew Engel, Eleven Minutes Late: A Train Journey to the Soul of Britain
 Daniel Metcalfe, Out of Steppe
 Susan Richards, Lost and Found in Russia
 Hugh Thomson, Tequila Oil: Getting Lost in Mexico
  Ian Thomson, The Dead Yard

2009

  Alice Albinia, Empires of the Indus
 Andrew Brown, Fishing in Utopia
 Richard Grant, Bandit Roads
 Kapka Kassabova, Street Without a Name
 Grevel Lindop, Travels on the Dance Floor
 Dervla Murphy, The Island that Dared

2008
 Tim Butcher, Blood River
 Henry Hemming, Misadventure in the Middle East
  John Lucas, 92 Acharnon Street
 Robert Macfarlane, The Wild Places
 Christopher Robbins, In Search of Kazakhstan: The Land that Disappeared

2007
 Rory McCarthy, Nobody Told Us We Are Defeated
 David McKie, Great British Bus Journeys
 Tom Parry, Thumbs Up Australia: Hitchhiking the Outback
  Claire Scobie, Last Seen in Lhasa

2006
  Nicholas Jubber, The Prester Quest
 Joanna Kavenna, The Ice Museum
 Ruth Padel, Tigers in Red Weather: A Quest for the Last Wild Tigers
 Richard Lloyd Parry, In the Time of Madness
 Stevie Smith, Pedalling to Hawaii

Edward Stanford Outstanding Contribution to Travel Writing award 
A lifetime achievement award for travel writing.

 2021 Dervla Murphy
 2020 Paul Theroux
 2019 Colin Thubron
 2018 Jan Morris
 2017 no award 
 2016 Michael Palin
 2015 Bill Bryson

Fiction with a Sense of Place 
 2020 Nickolas Butler, Little Faith
 2019 Novuyo Rosa Tshuma, House of Stone
 2018 Tristan Hughes, Hummingbird
 2017 no award
 2016 Madeleine Thien, Do Not Say We Have Nothing

Adventure Travel Book of the Year 
2020 Lara Prior-Palmer, Rough Magic: Riding the World's Wildest Horse Race
2019 Adam Weymouth, Kings of the Yukon: One Summer Paddling Across the Far North
2018 Morten Strøksnes, Shark Drunk: The Art of Catching a Large Shark from a Tiny Rubber Dinghy in a Big Ocean
2017 no award 
2016 Levison Wood, Walking the Himalayas

Travel Memoir of the Year 
 2020 Pico Iyer, A Beginner's Guide to Japan: Observations and Provocations
 2019 Guy Stagg, The Crossway

Children's Travel Book of the Year 
2019 Alastair Humphreys, Alastair Humphreys' Great Adventurers
2018 Katherine Rundell and illustrated by Hannah Horn, The Explorer
2017 no award 
2016 Lucy Letherland, Rachel Williams & Emily Hawkins, Atlas of Animal Adventures

Photography & Illustrated Travel Book of the Year 
2019 Huw Lewis-Jones, The Writer's Map: An Atlas of Imaginary Lands
2018 Londonist Mapped by AA Publishing
2017 no award 
2016 Malachy Tallack & Katie Scott, The Un-Discovered Islands

Food & Travel Book of the Year 
2020 Eleanor Ford, Fire Islands
2019 Caroline Eden, Black Sea: Dispatches and Recipes, Through Darkness and Light
2018 Bart van Olphen, Bart's Fish Tales
2017 no award 
2016 Tessa Kiros, Provence to Pondicherry

Innovation in Travel Publishing 
2017-2019 no award 
2016 James Cheshire & Oliver Uberti, Where the Animals Go

New Travel Writer of the Year 
2019 Celia Dillow, Reflections of Dubai
2018 Alan Packer, The Village Sledge Run
2017 no award 
2016 Dom Tulett, The Tiger's Tail

Travel Blog of the Year 
2019 no award
2018 Dave McClane, Man Vs Globe 
2017 no award 
2016 Lauren Williams, The Enjoyable Rut

Notes

External links
 Edward Stanford Travel Writing Awards
 Dolman Best Travel Book Award at The Authors' Club (old site)
 Dolman Best Travel Book Award and Shortlist at LibraryThing

Travel writing
British non-fiction literary awards
Awards established in 2006
2006 establishments in the United Kingdom